Jim Blanks (born August 13, 1952) is an American former basketball player. He began his collegiate career with the Moberly Greyhounds before he transferred to play for the Gardner–Webb Runnin' Bulldogs for his final three seasons of eligibility. Blanks was an NAIA All-American selection during his senior season in 1974–75. He ranks in the top 10 of total points and rebounds for the Runnin' Bulldogs.

Blanks was selected by the Houston Rockets as the 29th overall pick in the 1975 NBA draft. He was waived by the Rockets on the eve of the 1975–76 NBA season and ultimately never played a game in the National Basketball Association (NBA).

References

1952 births
Living people
African-American basketball players
American men's basketball players
Basketball players from Kansas City, Missouri
Gardner–Webb Runnin' Bulldogs men's basketball players
Houston Rockets draft picks
Moberly Greyhounds men's basketball players
Shooting guards
Small forwards
21st-century African-American people
20th-century African-American sportspeople